Route 367 is a  long roadway in the metropolitan St. Louis, Missouri, United States area. It is also known as Lewis & Clark Boulevard. Its northern terminus is U.S. Route 67 (US 67) near Black Jack and its southern terminus is at the Interstate 70 (I-70) bridge over Riverview Boulevard before Riverview Boulevard becomes Bircher Boulevard in St. Louis. It was originally part of US 67.

History
In December 2007, a multi-year reconstruction project to convert the St. Louis County portion of Route 367 to freeway status was completed. The road was designed in the 1950s, and needed rebuilding, partly because of very short turn lanes and closely adjacent outer service roads. The new freeway now helps to provide a more direct route between St. Louis and the Alton, Illinois section of the St. Louis Metro East. Existing bridges were replaced at Chambers Road, Coldwater Creek, and the BNSF railroad tracks. South of I-270, Route 367 is planned as more of a parkway, where both arterial and residential streets will continue to intersect the roadway.

In the City of St. Louis portion, no major improvements are planned. This section includes the Halls Ferry Circle, where six major roadways converge.

Major intersections

References

External links

367
U.S. Route 67
Streets in St. Louis
Transportation in St. Louis County, Missouri